Calliostoma haliarchus, common name the sea monarch top shell, is a species of sea snail, a marine gastropod mollusk in the family Calliostomatidae.

Description
The height of the shell varies between 40 mm and 50 mm. This species has a fine, top-shaped, erectly conical shell, which is almost triangular in side view, with a sharp basal angle. The tall, flat-sided spire has 9-10 whorls. They are plane, sloping, nearly smooth, and encircled by delicate lirae, with little granules. Two in the vicinity of the suture are larger and.  decorated with larger grainsThe body whorl is acutely angled at the base  The shell surface appears smooth, but is encircled by many fine granulated spiral striae.  The base is a little inflated.  The umbilicus is absent.  Color is light brown with darker brown spots or white patterns present on the spiral striae. The lirae of the base of the shell are nearly smooth and dotted. The base is plane and subconvex. The columella is callous. The fauces (the part of a spiral shell that can be seen when looking into the aperture) are smoothly striate.

Distribution
This species occurs in Southern Hokkaido, Japan and southwards, at 50 to 200 m depth on fine sand. It is also found off the Oga Peninsula, Japan Sea, and Cheju Island, Korea. It also occurs in the southwest Pacific.

References

 Trew, A., 1984. The Melvill-Tomlin Collection. Part 30. Trochacea. Handlists of the Molluscan Collections in the Department of Zoology, National Museum of Wales.

External links
 

haliarchus
Gastropods described in 1889